FC Hradec Králové is a Czech football club based in the city of Hradec Králové. The club, which was founded in 1905, won the Czechoslovak First League in the 1959–60 season. The club currently plays in the Czech First League.

Following their domestic success, Hradec played in the 1960–61 European Cup and was eliminated by Barcelona in the quarter-finals, Barcelona eventually becoming runners-up. In 1995 Hradec won the Czech Cup and subsequently played in the Cup Winners' Cup, where it was eliminated in the round of 16 by Dynamo Moscow. In the 2002–03 season they were relegated to the Second Division. They returned to the top flight in 2009–10 only to be relegated once more in 2012–13; however they would place second in the 2. Liga signifying a return to the top division for the 2014–15 season.

History
Hradec Králové first played in the Czechoslovak First League in 1956. They were relegated after two seasons, but returned for the 1959–60 season, winning the league that same season. They went on to compete in the 1960–61 European Cup, being eliminated by Barcelona in the quarter-finals, a team which would go on to reach the semi-finals.

Hradec Králové were again relegated in 1963. They enjoyed four more spells in the First League, each lasting only one or two seasons. Their last promotion to the Czechoslovak top tier came in 1990. Hradec then played in the newly formed Czech First League from its inception in 1993 until being relegated at the end of the 1999–00 season. Their best league finish in this time was 8th place, which they achieved in the 1998–99 season. The 1990s also saw the club triumph in the Czech Cup, winning the competition in 1995. This achievement saw the club qualify for the Cup Winners' Cup, where they were eliminated in the round of 16 by Dynamo Moscow.

The club returned to the top flight in 2001 after winning the Czech 2. Liga at the first attempt, securing promotion with four games to spare. After just two seasons though, the club again finished in the relegation places and were relegated back to the second tier. This time it was seven seasons before the club would achieve promotion, winning the 2009–10 Czech 2. Liga to secure their status in the top flight once more. Hradec equalled their best Czech First League finishing position of 8th in the 2010–11 season.

Historical names
 1905: SK Hradec Králové
 1948: Sokol Hradec Králové
 1949: Sokol Škoda
 1953: DSO Spartak Hradec Králové (Dobrovolná Sportovní Organisace Spartak Hradec Králové)
 1976: TJ Spartak ZVU Hradec
 1989: RH Spartak ZVU Hradec Králové
 1990: SKP Spartak Hradec Králové
 1992: SKP Fomei Hradec Králové
 1994: SK Hradec Králové
 2005: FC Hradec Králové

Players

Current squad
.

Out on loan

Notable former players

Player records in the Czech First League
.
Highlighted players are in the current squad.

Most appearances

Most goals

Most clean sheets

Managers

 Jiří Zástěra (1959–60)
 Oldřich Šubrt (1961–64)
 Josef "Pepi" Bican (1964)
 František Havránek (1964–66)
 Otto Hemele (1968–69)
 Zdeněk Krejčí (1971–73)
 Ladislav Moník (1977–78)
 Dušan Uhrin (1980–81)
 Zdeněk Krejčí (1985–86)
 Karol Dobiaš (1988)
 Ladislav Škorpil (1991–93)
 Štefan Nadzam (1993–94)
 Petr Pálka (1994–95)
 Luděk Zajíc (1995–96)
 Dušan Radolský (1996)
 Vladimír Táborský (1996–97)
 Jaroslav Hřebík (1997–98)
 Ladislav Škorpil (1998)
 Stanislav Kocourek (1999)
 Milan Petřík (1999)
 Petr Uličný (2000–03)
 Leoš Kalvoda (2003)
 Martin Pulpit (2004)
 Juraj Šimurka (2004–05)
 Oldřich Machala (July 2008 – March 9)
 Václav Kotal (March 2009 – June 12)
 Jiří Plíšek (July 2012 – April 13)
 Luboš Prokopec (April 2013 – Oct 14)
 Bohuslav Pilný (Oct 2014 – May 2017)
 Karel Havlíček (Jun 2017 – May 2018)
 Zdenko Frťala (Jun 2018 – Jun 2021)
 Miroslav Koubek (Jun 2021 – present)

History in domestic competitions

 Seasons spent at Level 1 of the football league system: 19
 Seasons spent at Level 2 of the football league system: 16
 Seasons spent at Level 3 of the football league system: 0
 Seasons spent at Level 4 of the football league system: 0

Czechoslovakia

Czech Republic

History in European competitions

Honours
Czechoslovak First League (first tier)
 Champions: 1959–60
Czech Cup
 Winners: 1994–95
Czech 2. Liga (second tier)
 Winners: 2000–01, 2009–10

Club records

Czech First League records
Best position: 6th (2021–22)
Worst position: 16th (1999–2000, 2002–03)
Biggest home win: Hradec Králové 5–0 Benešov (1994–95)
Biggest away win: České Budějovice 0–3 Hradec Králové (1995–96), Plzeň 0–3 Hradec Králové (1998–99), Teplice 0–3 Hradec Králové (2011–12), Slovácko 0–3 Hradec Králové (2011–12), Bohemians 1905 0–3 Hradec Králové (2016–17)
Biggest home defeat: Hradec Králové 0–5 Sparta Prague (2001–02)
Biggest away defeat: Jablonec 7–0 Hradec Králové (2010–11)

References

External links
 

 
Football clubs in the Czech Republic
Association football clubs established in 1905
Czechoslovak First League clubs
Czech First League clubs
Football clubs in Czechoslovakia
1905 establishments in Austria-Hungary